Tagarbala was a Roman–Berber civitas of the province of Byzacena during late antiquity. It was a Roman Catholic diocese.

The town is identifiable with stone ruins at Bordj-Tamra, Tamera in modern Tunisia.

Roman Tagarbala was also the seat of an ancient Christian episcopal see. One bishop is known of this ancient diocese, Fortunatianus, who participated in the synod in Carthage in 484 called by the Vandal king Huneric, after which Fortunatianus was exiled.
 
Today Tagarbala survives as titular bishopric, which is currently vacant.

References 

Catholic titular sees in Africa
Ancient Berber cities
Roman towns and cities in Tunisia
Archaeological sites in Tunisia